The 2012 Women's World Team Squash Championships is the women's edition of the 2012 World Team Squash Championships, which serves as the world team championship for squash players. The event were held in Nîmes, France and took place from November 12 to November 17, 2012. The tournament was organized by the World Squash Federation and the French Squash Federation. The Egypt team won his second World Team Championships beating the English team in the final.

Participating teams
A total of 26 teams competed from all the five confederations: Africa, America, Asia, Europe and Oceania. For Argentina, Czech Republic, Namibia and South Korea, it was their first participation at a world team championship.

Seeds

Squads

  England
 Laura Massaro
 Alison Waters
 Jenny Duncalf
 Sarah Kippax

  Mexico
 Samantha Terán
 Karla Urrutia
 Nayelly Hernández
 Monsserrat Castellanos

  South Korea
 Song Sun-mi
 Park Eun-Ok
 Yang Yeon-Soe
 Kim Ga-Hye

  Egypt
 Raneem El Weleily
 Nour El Sherbini
 Nour El Tayeb
 Omneya Abdel Kawy

  Wales
 Tesni Evans
 Deon Saffery
 Hannah Davies
 Fiona Murphy

  Scotland
 Lisa Aitken
 Frania Gillen-Buchert
 Alex Clark
 Rosie Allen

  Malaysia
 Nicol David
 Low Wee Wern
 Delia Arnold
 Siti Munirah Jusoh

  South Africa
 Siyoli Waters
 Diana Haynes
 Milnay Louw
 Cheyna Tucker

  China
 Li Dongjin
 Gu Jinyeu
 Xiu Chen
 Not Used

  Spain
 Marina De Juan Gallach
 Xisela Aranda Núñez
 Cristina Gómez
 Chantal Moros-Pitarch

  Hong Kong
 Annie Au
 Joey Chan
 Liu Tsz-Ling
 Tong Tsz-Wing

  Czech Republic
 Lucie Fialová
 Olga Ertlová
 Anna Klimundova
 Kristyna Alexova

  Colombia
 Catalina Pelaez
 Silvia Augulo
 Karol Gonzalez
 Gabriela Porras

  Namibia
 Isabel Schnoor
 Adrianna Lambert
 Lucinda Rodrigues
 Ruth Hornickel

  New Zealand
 Joelle King
 Jaclyn Hawkes
 Kylie Lindsay
 Amanda Landers-Murphy

  United States
 Natalie Grainger
 Kristen Lange
 Sabrina Sobhy
 Olivia Fiechter

  Japan
 Misaki Kobayashi
 Chinatsu Matsui
 Mayu Yamazaki
 Risa Sugimoto

  Australia
 Rachael Grinham
 Donna Urquhart
 Melody Francis
 Sarah Cardwell

  Canada
 Samantha Cornett
 Alexandra Norman
 Susannah King
 Stephanie Edmison

  Austria
 Birgit Coufal
 Judith Gradnitzer
 Jacqueline Peychar
 Ines Winkler

  Ireland
 Madeline Perry
 Aisling Blake
 Laura Mylotte
 Breanne Flynn

  India
 Dipika Pallikal
 Joshna Chinappa
 Anaka Alankamony
 Aparajitha Balamurukan

  Argentina
 Antonella Falcione
 Cecilia Cerquetti
 Fernanda Rocha
 Maria Bonilla

  Netherlands
 Natalie Grinham
 Orla Noom
 Milou van der Heijden
 Milja Dorenbos

  France
 Camille Serme
 Coline Aumard
 Maud Duplomb
 Laura Pomportes

  Germany
 Pamela Hathway
 Franziska Hennes
 Annika Weise
 Caroline Sayegh

Group stage

Pool A

Pool B

Pool C

Pool D

Pool E

Pool F

Pool G

Pool H

Finals

Draw

Results

Quarterfinals

Semifinals

Final

Post-tournament team ranking

See also 
 World Team Squash Championships

References

External links 
Women's World Team Squash Championships 2012 Official Website
Women's World Team Squash Championships 2012 SquashSite Website

Squash tournaments in France
World Squash Championships
Squash
W
2012 in women's squash
International sports competitions hosted by France